The 6th Politburo of the Workers' Party of Korea (WPK)(6차 조선로동당 정치국), officially the Political Bureau of the 6th Central Committee of the Workers' Party of Korea, was elected by the 1st Plenary Session of the 6th Central Committee in the immediate aftermath of the 6th WPK Congress.

Members

1st Plenary Session

September 1998–September 2010

September 2010–April 2012

April 2012–February 2015

References

Citations

Bibliography
Books:
 
 
  

Dissertations:
 

6th Politburo of the Workers' Party of Korea
1980 establishments in North Korea
2016 disestablishments in North Korea